The Stout–Vogel Ministry was the second responsible government to be formed in New Zealand. It formed in September 1884 and governed until October 1887. From the outset, Robert Stout served as Prime Minister as well as Attorney-General whilst Julius Vogel held the post of Minister of Finance. Initially, the ministry had lasted only two weeks, with Harry Atkinson managing to pass a vote of no confidence against Stout. However, Atkinson failed to establish his own government, and was supplanted by Stout and Vogel who remained in power for the next three years.

Background
Vogel had the larger following in the coalition, but his poor health caused him to yield the premiership to Stout. Regardless, many observers still saw Vogel as the more dominant partner in the alliance. Both men were highly active in building consensus between the growing labour movement and middle-class liberalism. Both leaders were likeminded on social policy, however frequently clashed over financial policy.

At the time the ministry was formed, New Zealand was in a prolonged economic recession. As Treasurer, Vogel did what he could to promote recovery, including borrowing, though with little success. The initially hopeful populace lost faith that the government could restore economic prosperity, viewing that retrenchment was the only solution, not expansionism. Atkinson passed another motion of no confidence against the government on 28 May 1887. Stout was granted a dissolution, but the subsequent election went against the Ministry and Stout himself suffered the indignity of losing his own seat.

Ministers
The following members served in the reconstructed Stout–Vogel Ministry:

Notes

References

See also
 Government of New Zealand

Ministries of Queen Victoria
Governments of New Zealand
1884 establishments in New Zealand
1887 disestablishments in New Zealand
Stout–Vogel Ministry
Stout–Vogel Ministry